Washingtonia robusta, known by common name as the Mexican fan palm, Mexican washingtonia, or skyduster is a palm tree native to the Baja California peninsula and a small part of Sonora in northwestern Mexico. Despite its limited native distribution, W. robusta one of the most widely cultivated subtropical palms in the world. It is naturalized in Florida, California, Hawaii, Texas, parts of the Canary Islands, France, Italy, Israel, Jordan, Lebanon, Qatar, Spain, Réunion, and Morocco.

Description
The petioles are armed with sharp thorns. The fruit is a spherical, blue-black drupe,  diameter; it is edible, though thin-fleshed.

Taxonomy 
It is one of two species in the genus Washingtonia. The other is the close relative Washingtonia filifera, which occupies a more northerly distribution. Compared with W. robusta, W. filifera has a thicker trunk and dull green leaves.

Nomenclature 

 English: Mexican fan palm, Mexican washingtonia, skyduster
 Spanish: abanico, palma colorado, palma real, palma blanca, palma negra
 Seri: Zamij ctam

Distribution 
This palm is native to the Baja California peninsula and Sonora. On the peninsula, it occurs from the Sierra de La Asamblea and the Baja California Desert south into the Vizcaino region and the Sierra de La Giganta, and into the southern cape. In Sonora, it occurs in canyons in the western half of the state, particularly in the palm oases of the Sierra El Aguaje north of Guaymas. It is relatively restricted, and is suspected to be a relict population in Sonora. It has the least number of plants in the palm oases that are shared with two other more numerous species, Brahea brandegeei and Sabal uresana.

Cultivation

Like the closely related Washingtonia filifera (California fan palm), it is grown as an ornamental tree.

Field research conducted on W. robusta in its native habitat on the Baja California peninsula concluded that its potential longevity may exceed 500 years.

Supporting research by Barry Tomlinson and Brett Huggett states that there is "evidence for extreme longevity of metabolically functioning cells of considerable diversity in palm stems."  Many of the iconic "sky dusters" of Los Angeles that have survived the chainsaws of progress are documented in photography from the 19th century.

The Mexican fan palm is normally grown in the desert Southwestern United States, in areas such as California, Arizona, southern Nevada, extreme southwestern Utah and Texas. It also cultivated in the coastal areas of South Atlantic states and the Gulf Coast, including extreme southern North Carolina, coastal South Carolina, southern Georgia, and Florida. Along the Gulf Coast, Mexican fan palms can be found growing along the Florida west coast westward to South Texas.

Washingtonia × filibusta is a hybrid of W. robusta and W. filifera, and has intermediate characteristics of the two parents, especially greater tolerance of wet cold.

Gallery

References

External links
Flora of North America Vol. 22 Page 106 Mexican fan palm, palmier évantail du Mexique  Washingtonia robusta H. Wendland, Garten-Zeitum (Berlin). 2: 198. 1883.
Scanpalm - Washingtonia robusta

Robusta
Plants described in 1883
Trees of Sonora
Trees of Baja California Sur
North American desert flora
Trees of Mediterranean climate
Ornamental trees